is a Japanese footballer currently playing as a midfielder for Sagan Tosu.

Career statistics

Club
.

Notes

References

2004 births
Living people
Association football people from Fukuoka Prefecture
Japanese footballers
Japan youth international footballers
Association football midfielders
Sagan Tosu players